The Nokia 6315i was a cell phone released in 2006 by Verizon Wireless for the United States market.  Though branded as a Nokia model, the phone was manufactured by Pantech. The budget-priced 6315i featured Bluetooth, integrated video recording and speakerphone.

External links
 Nokia 6315i (Verizon Wireless) - CNET Reviews

6315i